Yozgat YHT railway station, short for Yozgat Yüksek Hızlı Tren station, is a railway station located just north of the village of Divanlı, about  south of Yozgat.

Due to the mountainous terrain of the land, the railway will not be built directly near the city of Yozgat. The station will become the realization of the Turkish State Railways' 70-year-old plan to build a railway line to Yozgat as the original railway was planned to be built from Yerköy to Yozgat in 1948.

References

External links
Ankara-Sivas high-speed railway project 

Railway stations in Yozgat Province
Buildings and structures in Yozgat Province
High-speed railway stations in Turkey
Railway stations under construction in Turkey
Transport in Yozgat Province